Yu Yan may refer to:
 Yu Yan (constituency), a constituency of the Sha Tin District Council
 Yu Yan (physician), Chinese physician
 Yu Yan (singer), Chinese singer and actress
 Yuyan Chinese calligrapher
 Fable (album) or Yùyán, a 2000 album by Faye Wong